| top point scorer = 
| top try scorer = 
| website    = https://ferugby.es/calendario-liga-iberdrola
| prevseason = 2021–22
| nextseason = 2023–24
| teams = 8
}}

The 2022–23 Liga Iberdrola de Rugby is the 13th season of the Liga Iberdrola de Rugby, the top flight of Spanish domestic women's rugby union competition and the 7th to be sponsored by Iberdrola. The reigning champions entering the season are Corteva Cocos who claimed their 2nd league title after winning the 2021 final against Majadahonda.

Teams 

Eight teams compete in the league – the top seven teams from the previous season and Crealia El Salvador who were promoted as champions of the 2021–22 Honor Division B. They replaced Sanse Scrum who were relegated after nine years in the top flight.

Table

Regular season
Fixtures for the season were announced by the Spanish Rugby Federation on 26 July 2022. The league kicked off on October 1st

Round 1

Round 2

Round 3

Round 4

Round 5

Round 6

Round 7

Round 8

Round 9

Round 10

Round 11

Round 12

Round 13

Round 14

Play-offs

Semi-finals

Final

Leading scorers

Most points

Most tries

References 

 

2022–23 in European rugby union leagues
2022–23 in Spanish rugby union